Leamington Spa Avenue railway station was a station serving Leamington Spa, Warwickshire.

History
It was opened in February 1854 by the London and North Western Railway (LNWR), three years after the line from Coventry to Leamington was extended from its original terminus at Milverton into the centre of Leamington, and joined end-on to the branch line to Rugby. It was built alongside the Great Western Railway's Leamington station (which is still in operation) and provided a more convenient station in Leamington than the LNWR's original Milverton terminus. The original station was temporary, and made from wood, it was rebuilt as a permanent brick station in 1860.

Leamington Spa Avenue provided passenger services towards Coventry, Rugby and Weedon via Daventry, but was closed in 1965 as a part of the Beeching cuts. The Coventry line was diverted into the former Great Western station and the branches towards Rugby and Weedon were closed. The site of the station was levelled in 1977 to make way for redevelopment. The site was originally covered by a garage, bus depot and public car park. In the late 2010s the site was cleared to make way for low rise residential housing and offices.

References

Disused railway stations in Warwickshire
Former London and North Western Railway stations
Railway stations in Great Britain opened in 1844
Railway stations in Great Britain closed in 1965
Beeching closures in England